The Transmissionary Six was actually the songwriting team of Terri Moeller and Paul Austin, the former a longtime drummer of The Walkabouts, the latter a founding member of the Willard Grant Conspiracy. Between 2002 and 2013 the band - lead vocalist Moeller and guitarist Austin, augmented by a rotating cast of supporting musicians - released six albums, appeared on numerous compilations, and toured worldwide several times. The group's output is neatly summed up in a best-of release, "Songs 2002-2012". The Transmissionary Six still play locally on occasion in their hometown of Seattle, for the most part on an impromptu and low-key basis. 

American musical duos